Tudor Gabriel Butnariu (born 12 March 1995) is a Romanian rugby union player. He plays as a hooker for professional SuperLiga club Steaua București.

Career

Butnariu played during his career for Politehnica Iași from where he transferred to Steaua in 2018. He also played for the Romania national under-20 rugby union team.

International career
Butnariu has also been selected for Romania's national team, the Oaks, making his international debut during the 3rd week of 2021 Autumn Nations Series in a test match against Los Teros on 7 November 2021.

References

External links

1995 births
Living people
Sportspeople from Iași
Romanian rugby union players
Romania international rugby union players
CSA Steaua București (rugby union) players
CS Politehnica Iași (rugby union) players
Rugby union hookers